Flevo Boys is a football club from Emmeloord, Netherlands.

Founded on 1 May 1957, the club currently competes in the Hoofdklasse.

Honours
 Vierde klasse
 Winners 1969
 Derde klasse
 Winners 1971
 Tweede klasse
 Winners 1982, 1993
 Districtsbeker Oost
 Winners 1991
 Districtsbeker Noord
 Winners 2018

References

External links
Official website 

Football clubs in the Netherlands
Football clubs in Flevoland
Association football clubs established in 1957
1957 establishments in the Netherlands
Football in Noordoostpolder